International School of the Sacred Heart (ISSH) is a Kindergarten (co-ed) – Grades 1–12 (all girls) school in Shibuya, Tokyo, Japan, founded in 1908.  As part of the Network of Sacred Heart Schools it is affiliated with schools and institutions in 44 countries.
The International School of the Sacred Heart (ISSH) is a multicultural Catholic school. Kindergarten classes for 3, 4 and 5 year olds are for boys and girls, while grades 1–12 are for girls only. ISSH is located in the Hiroo neighborhood and was founded in 1908, belonging to a worldwide network of the Schools of the Sacred Heart.

History
The International School of the Sacred Heart in Tokyo is one of an international group of schools and colleges under the direction of the religious Society of the Sacred Heart.

The Society of the Sacred Heart was founded in Amiens, France, on November 21, 1800, by Saint Madeleine Sophie Barat to meet the needs of a particular form of education for girls in a changing world.

Beginning in 2017, the school began investigating allegations of sexual abuse by a former teacher, which allegedly occurred in the 1990s and 2000s.

Curriculum
The curriculum is drawn from International curricula and provides programs such as the Advanced Placement and English as a second language (ESL).

Instruction at the school is in English, Languages including French and Japanese are offered. The testing program includes the PSAT/National Merit Scholarship Qualifying Test, the SAT, and the International Schools Assessment.

The activities program includes athletics, drama, music, as well as competition in sports, intellectual and artistic fields, mainly in the Kanto Plains Association of Schools.

Kindergarten and Junior School (Kindergarten – Grade 4)
The curriculum in the Kindergarten and Junior School (KG/JS) includes an integrated balanced literacy language arts program, (reading, writing, speaking, and listening), mathematics, science and social studies that are integrated through the International Primary Curriculum.

Middle School (Grades 5–8)
All Middle School students study English, mathematics, science, social studies, art, drama, foreign languages, music, personal and social education, physical education, pottery/3D Art, and values.

High School (Grades 9–12)
Sacred Heart has a Creative and Performing Arts department as well as an extracurricular program where students can participate in sports, music, and drama. The ISSH diploma is granted to students who have earned a minimum of 22 credits and have successfully fulfilled all of the requirements.

Notable alumni 
 Masako Shirasu, author and collector
 Joan Fontaine, British-American actress
 Yoko Narahashi, casting director
 Ippongi Bang, manga artist
 Maiko, actress
 Emma Miyazawa, actress
 Giselle, rapper and singer (Aespa) 
 Rima Nakabayashi, rapper and singer (NiziU)
 Hiroko Kuniya, news presenter and journalist
 Blaine Trump, socialite and former sister-in-law of Donald Trump

See also

 Japan Council of International Schools
 East Asia Regional Council of Overseas Schools

References

External links
 Official website

Christianity in Tokyo
Private schools in Japan
Educational institutions established in 1908
Catholic schools in Japan
Elementary schools in Japan
Girls' schools in Japan
1908 establishments in Japan
Sacred Heart schools
Alliance of Girls' Schools Australasia
International schools in Tokyo
Shibuya